Thomas Rivett (1679–1724) was a British politician. He was Mayor of Derby in 1715. He married Elizabeth Eaton on 9 December 1708 with whom he had two children: Thomas Rivett, Esq., and Sarah Rivett.

References

External links 
 BURKE, Bernard, 1865. Genealogical and heraldic dictionary of the peerage and baronetage of the british empire

1679 births
1724 deaths
People from Derby
Mayors of Derby